Conop is a commune located in Arad County, Romania. Conop is situated at the southern foot of Zărand Mountains, in the Mureș Couloir. The commune stretches over 5420 ha and it is composed of five villages: Belotinț (Belotinc), Chelmac (Maroseperjes), Conop (situated 50 km from Arad), Milova (Milova) and Odvoș (Odvos).

Population
According to the last census the population of the commune counts 2342 inhabitants. From an ethnic point of view it has the following structure: 98,4% are Romanians, 0,5% Hungarians, 0,2% Germans, 0,4% Ukrainians and 0,5% are of other or undeclared  nationalities.

History
The first documentary record of the locality Conop dates back to 1506. The other settlements were attested as follows: Belotinț in 1607, Chelmac in 1717, Milova and Odvoș in 1440.

Economy
The commune's present-day economy can be characterized by a powerful dynamic force with significant developments in all the sectors present in the commune. Conop is known as an important fructiferous basin of the region.

Tourism
Conop commune can become an area with touristic attraction by trimming up its anthropic and natural potential. Among the most important touristic sights of the commune put under protection we can mention the walls of the Eperyes monastery in Chelmac, the Ștefan Cicio-Pop mansion in Conop built at the end of the 18th century - today being a general school, the ruins of the mining exploitation "Zidurile de la Tău" in Milova (1800) and the Konopi castle in Odvoș, built in the 18th century in neoclassic style. Another touristic sight of the commune is the school camp in Odvoș.

References

Communes in Arad County
Localities in Crișana